Joseph Shaun Hodge (born 14 September 2002) is a professional footballer who plays as a midfielder for the Republic of Ireland youth international squad, and Wolverhampton Wanderers, where made his Premier League debut against Chelsea on 8 October 2022. Born in England, he represents the Republic of Ireland U21 national team internationally.

Career
Hodge started his career with Premier League side Manchester City. Before the 2021 season, he was sent on loan to League of Ireland Premier Division club Derry City but departed the club without making a competitive appearance due to injury. In 2021, Hodge signed for English Premier League club Wolverhampton Wanderers.

Career statistics

Honours 
Manchester City
 FA Youth Cup: 2019–20

References

External links
Profile at the Wolverhampton Wanderers F.C. website

Living people
2002 births
English people of Irish descent
Republic of Ireland association footballers
English footballers
Footballers from Manchester
Association football midfielders
Republic of Ireland youth international footballers
Premier League players
Manchester City F.C. players
Derry City F.C. players
Wolverhampton Wanderers F.C. players
Republic of Ireland expatriate association footballers
English expatriate footballers
Expatriate association footballers in Northern Ireland